Euchromia amoena, the pleasant hornet moth, is a moth of the subfamily Arctiinae. It was described by Heinrich Benno Möschler in 1872.

Description
Forewings are black, with a golden-yellow basal half, red at the base, with black veins and a golden-yellow postmedian band. Hindwings are golden yellow with a broad black apical border. On the abdomen there are two pale yellow bands.

The larvae feed on Carissa macrocarpa, Ipomoea, Secamone gerrardi and Stictocardia tiliifolia.

Distribution
It is found in Bangladesh, Kenya, Madagascar, Mozambique, South Africa and Tanzania.

References

Moths described in 1872
Euchromiina
Moths of Sub-Saharan Africa
Insects of Bangladesh